Humbug is an exclamation pertaining to "nonsense, gibberish".
Humbug (sweet) can also be a peppermint sweet.

Places
Humbug, Arizona, U.S., a ghost town in the southern Bradshaw Mountains of Yavapai County
Humbug, California, an unincorporated community in California, U.S.
Humbug, U.S. Virgin Islands, settlement in the United States Virgin Islands
Humbug Mountain, a coastal mountain in Oregon, U.S.
Mount Humbug, a mountain in Montana, U.S.
Humbug Reach, a part of the Brisbane River in Queensland, Australia

Entertainment
Humbug, a character in Norton Juster's book The Phantom Tollbooth
Humbug (album), a 2009 album by Arctic Monkeys
Humbug (comics), a fictional character in the Marvel Comics universe
Humbug (magazine), a humor magazine that began in August 1957
"Humbug" (The X-Files), an episode of the television series The X-Files
"The Humbug" ("Le Humbug" in French), a short story by Jules Verne
"Humbug" (1869-1870), an Australian satirical magazine in Melbourne
Humbug, an etheral monster on My Singing Monsters

Other uses
HUM bug (e.g. Pseudomonas aeruginosa), a hydrocarbon-utilizing microorganism that lives in jet fuel
Humbug (Aboriginal), a slang term meaning "begging" in some Australian Aboriginal communities
Humbug (sweet), a traditional hard mint candy made in the United Kingdom